Saint Leibowitz and the Wild Horse Woman (1997) is a science fiction novel by American writer Walter M. Miller Jr. It is a follow-up to Miller's 1959 book A Canticle for Leibowitz. Miller wrote the majority of the novel before his death in 1996; the rest was completed based on Miller's notes and outlines by Terry Bisson.

The novel is set chronologically some eighty years after the events of the second part of A Canticle for Leibowitz, "Fiat Lux" (c. 3254 AD).

In the novel, the city of New Rome has been captured and allowed to decay by the Empire of Texarkana, led by the emperor Filpeo Harq.  The Papacy, in exile from New Rome, now resides in the city of Valana. The story chronicles the plan of a cardinal-deacon and his closest allies to unite the remaining independent nations in North America against the Empire, and to restore power to the Church.

Plot summary 

The main character of the novel is Brother Blacktooth "Nimmy" St. George, a monk at Leibowitz Abbey. Brother Blacktooth, a former Nomad, is fluent both in Nomadic and Churchspeak. Unsatisfied with his job as a translator of ancient texts, and haunted by his roots as a Nomad, Blacktooth becomes increasingly restless. He feels pulled between the two societies: that of the church, and that of the wanderer. Blacktooth's reputation as a misfit compels the Abbot of Leibowitz, Jarad, to seek his expulsion from the order, while Blacktooth's unique linguistic skills attract the attention of the visiting Cardinal Elia Brownpony (called the Red Deacon since he was never ordained as a priest). Brownpony requires a translator in his travels in order to deal diplomatically with unruly Nomad tribes, the Grasshoppers and Jackrabbits.  Thus, Cardinal Brownpony decides to enlist Nimmy's services, saving him from disgrace at the hands of Jarad.

Brownpony and Nimmy set off to the conclave, along with Brownpony's other servants: Wooshin (aka "Axe"), a mysterious warrior from the Orient, and Chur Hongan (aka "Holy Madness"), his Nomadic driver. Soon afterward, the reigning Pope dies. A conclave of cardinals is called to elect a new one, including a Cardinal Abbess from N'Yok (New York). The Church had been exiled from the holy city of New Rome in previous decades because of an invasion by the king (or "Hannegan") of Texark. As a result, all papal affairs were conducted in the city of Valana, beyond the reach of the Texark empire.

During their journeys, the group (specifically, Holy Madness) have a divine vision. The vision is of the Night Hag, who only appears to a man in order to announce the death of someone else. It is from her appearance that Brownpony infers the death of the Pope. The Night Hag is one of the three avatars of the Nomad goddess, Open Sky. Open Sky's other two avatars are The Buzzard of Battle and the Wild Horse Woman.

Upon arriving at the settlement of Arch Hollow on the way to Valana, they are accosted by genetically handicapped Nomads. The Nomads are quickly subdued by Wooshin, an adept warrior. Among the Nomads, Nimmy has occasion to meet Ædrea, a beautiful mutant who is able to pass for healthy. The two fall in love, despite the fact that both are forbidden to fraternize: he because of his vows, she because of her genes. The group continues to Valana without her, and Nimmy is prohibited from seeing her again. Only after they have left Arch Hollow far behind does Blacktooth realize that he has left his rosary in Ædrea's possession.

At the Conclave, Brownpony surprises the assembled cardinals by openly admitting that he is of Nomad ancestry. He makes this confession in order to embarrass a Texark scholar who was then present. Unfortunately, immediately after the outburst, a sickly student marches into the auditorium and attempts to assassinate the very same Texark infiltrator. Given the timing, it is widely presumed that Brownpony was behind the assassination, so attempts are made on the lives of Blacktooth and Brownpony. The violence of the Conclave escalates to a breaking point. The citizens of Valana, impatient for a new Pope, sequester the Conclave until the rival factions of cardinals (some allied with the Church, others with Texark) elect a new Pope. Under duress, the Conclave elects Amen Specklebird, a cryptic and oracular vagrant, who doubles as a cult icon for the Valanian people. Amen's election marks the first stage in a series of events that escalate tensions between Texark and the Church.

Amen's reign as Pope proves to be short-lived. He makes an abortive attempt to return the Church to New Rome by sending a mission of Nomads and Cardinals east.  The convoy is turned away by Texark guardsmen. However, the Nomadic contingent of the convoy, being hungry and unpaid, decides to split from the Papal authority and raze the countryside around New Rome.  Brownpony, with his entourage, are arrested by the Hannegan, Filpeo Harq, after a tense standoff in his palace.  They are soon released under a suspended sentence of death.

After the mission's failure, Amen controversially resigns as Pope and retreats to his old vagrant's cave overlooking Valana.  While cardinals backed by the Hannegan declare the papacy illegitimate, a conclave of Valana clergy declare that Brownpony is Pope.  Taking the name Amen II, Brownpony declares an effective crusade against the Texark Empire, leading an alliance of Nomads to recapture New Rome and excommunicating the Hannegan's cardinals.

Meanwhile, Blacktooth accompanies the Valana militia, now led by Cardinals Nauwhat and Hadala, both of whom are of dubious loyalty to Brownpony's faction.  Suspicious Nomad detachments trap the militia between a Texark army and themselves, and Cardinal Nauwhat defects to the Texark camp.  One of Hadala's bodyguards, one of the Pope's Yellow Guards (elite Asian swordsmen), executes Hadala when he realizes that the cardinal has betrayed Brownpony.  Blacktooth rejoins Brownpony, who elevates him to the position of Cardinal and sends him to New Rome to announce the coming of the crusaders.

Blacktooth is seized by Texarks, who cast him into a New Rome dungeon.  He eventually becomes aware of fires in the city, and is alerted to the fact that the Nomads have deserted Brownpony's cause and are sacking the city and countryside, while a Texark relief force approaches.  He escapes the dungeon and falls into a drugged stupor, truly awakening in the damaged St. Peter's Cathedral, where he finds Brownpony and his last surviving bodyguard, Wooshin.  Their reunion is disrupted by the arrival of a Nomad warrior, who informs them that the last loyal portions of the crusading army are departing.  He warns them to flee, but Brownpony refuses and seats himself on the papal throne, the first Valana pope in decades to do so.  When the Pope becomes aware of approaching Texark cavalry, he commits seppuku.  Blacktooth stops Wooshin from joining him in the ritual act of suicide, and flees the approaching horsemen.

Blacktooth renounces his cardinalship before meeting briefly with the new, Texark-sponsored Pope, who turns out to be none other than the defected Cardinal Nauwhat.  Blacktooth learns that the Hannegan Filpeo Harq, too, is dead, assassinated in an act of self-sacrifice by the vengeful Wooshin.  It is mentioned that Blacktooth lived out his days as a hermit, not far from where Ædrea, now called Sister Clare, lives in a nunnery.

Publication history

After completing Canticle, Miller signed for another book with Lippincott, but the project apparently fell apart when the publisher offered only a small advance of $1,000. In 1978, Miller sent his agent, Don Congdon, a sixty-page excerpt from a "parallel novel" related to the earlier book. More than a decade later, Bantam publisher Lou Aronica learned of the draft, convinced Congdon to send him a copy, and quickly encouraged Miller to resume work on the novel. After Miller sent more than one hundred more pages to Aronica, Bantam contracted for the project a few months later, and Miller completed 250 more pages in 1990. Progress slowed, but by 1995 Miller had completed more than 600 pages. However, Miller was in ill health after the death of his wife and suffering from writer's block. Fearing that the new work would go unfinished, Miller arranged with author Terry Bisson to complete it. Bisson said he tied up the loose ends Miller had left. Miller died by suicide in early 1996, before the novel's 1997 publication.

Saint Leibowitz and the Wild Horse Woman has been called "Walter Miller's other novel." Reviewer Steven H. Silver points out that this "... is not to say that Saint Leibowitz and the Wild Horse Woman does not deserve to be read. It is a fantastic novel, only suffering in comparison to Miller's earlier work."

References

Sources
Roberson, W. H., 2011. Walter M. Miller Jr.,: A Reference Guide to His Fiction and His Life.
Roberson, W. H. and Battenfeld, R. L., 1992. Walter M. Miller Jr.: A Bio-Bibliography.
Secrest, Rose, 2002. Glorificemus: A Study of the Fiction of Walter M. Miller, Jr.

1997 American novels
Collaborative novels
1997 science fiction novels
American science fiction novels
American post-apocalyptic novels
Sequel novels
Texarkana
Novels by Walter M. Miller Jr.
Catholic novels
Novels published posthumously
Christian science fiction
Fiction set in the 4th millennium